The London Racers was a British ice hockey club based in London, England formerly members of the Elite Ice Hockey League. Although founded in 2003, it claimed to be a successor of the Harringay Racers club established in 1936. Due to a lack of suitable ice facility the club suspended its team operations part way through the 2005–06 season. It was the last professional ice hockey club to play in London.

2003–04 season
Formed and organized in only a few weeks, the Racers played their home games at Alexandra Palace. Erik Zachrisson captained the team. Their first season was a difficult one, as the team failed to win for some 40 games. Finally, a win arrived with a 3–0 victory over the Cardiff Devils. Another win followed as the team beat the Basingstoke Bison 4–0, but the team finished with a ghastly 3–49–2–2 record, still (as of 2010) the worst in league history.

2004–05 season
The team moved to the 1,200 capacity Lee Valley Ice Centre in Leyton, east London, although the arena was considered small for Elite League hockey. The offseason saw the hiring of former American Hockey League player Dennis Maxwell as Coach, who assembled a much stronger team, including perennial British all-star Steve Moria, and, with the 2004–05 NHL lockout, defenceman Eric Cairns and centre Scott Nichol from the National Hockey League. They made the playoffs in the sixth slot (out of seven teams) with a 19–19–9–3 record, but were eliminated by the Cardiff Devils.

2005–06 season
On 5 November, during a game against the Nottingham Panthers, defenseman Blaž Emeršič sustained serious facial injuries after colliding with a protruding object in the rink boardings. Days later on 13 November a piece of plexiglass was smashed. When the same section of glass smashed again at a training session the following Tuesday, serious questions regarding the safety of players and spectators were raised. Unable to find a new venue or secure agreement on improving safety at Lee Valley, the Racers withdrew their team from competitions on 21 November and subsequently folded.

Head-to-head results
This only counts competitive games. Losses include OT losses.
Seasons: 3 (2003-04-2005-06)
Record (W-L-T): N/A-N/A-N/A

Basingstoke Bison

Belfast Giants

Bracknell Bees

Cardiff Devils

Coventry Blaze

Dundee Stars

Edinburgh Capitals

Fife Flyers

Guildford Flames

Hull Stingrays

Manchester Phoenix

Newcastle Vipers

Nottingham Panthers

Sheffield Steelers

External links
 London Racers website 

Defunct ice hockey teams in the United Kingdom
Ice hockey clubs established in 2003
Ice hockey clubs disestablished in 2005
Ice hockey teams in London
Former Elite Ice Hockey League teams
2003 establishments in England
2005 disestablishments in England